The Sterling Micropolitan Statistical Area is a United States Census Bureau defined Micropolitan Statistical Area located in the Sterling area of the State of Colorado.  The Sterling Micropolitan Statistical Area is defined as Logan County, Colorado.  The Micropolitan Statistical Area had a population of 20,504 at the 2000 Census. A July 1, 2009 U.S. Census Bureau estimate placed the population at 20,772.

The Sterling Micropolitan Statistical Area includes the City of Sterling, the Town of Crook, the Town of Fleming, the Town of Iliff, the Town of Merino, the Town of Peetz, and the unincorporated areas of Logan County.

See also
Summit County, Colorado
Colorado census statistical areas
Colorado metropolitan areas
Combined Statistical Area
Core Based Statistical Area
Metropolitan Statistical Area
Micropolitan Statistical Area
Table of United States Combined Statistical Areas
Table of United States Metropolitan Statistical Areas
Table of United States Micropolitan Statistical Areas
Table of United States primary census statistical areas
Census statistical areas adjacent to the Sterling Micropolitan Statistical Area:
Denver-Aurora-Boulder Combined Statistical Area
Fort Morgan Micropolitan Statistical Area
Greeley Metropolitan Statistical Area

References

Micropolitan areas of Colorado
Sterling, Colorado